The Macintosh IIvx is a personal computer designed, manufactured and sold by Apple Computer from October 1992 to October 1993. It is the last of the Macintosh II family of Macintosh computers. The IIvx was introduced at the same time as the Macintosh IIvi, with both models using the same metal case design as the earlier Performa 600 and Performa 600CD. Like the Performa 600CD, the IIvx could be equipped with an internal double-speed CD-ROM drive.

The IIvx was described in a MacWorld magazine review as having "the best price-to-performance ratio of any computer Apple has ever built."

Overview
The Mac IIvx began its life in development as a proof-of-concept to see how an internal CD-ROM drive could be added to a Mac. But after Apple CEO John Sculley gave a speech at MacWorld Tokyo promising a Mac with a CD-ROM drive, the IIvx was rushed into production. Several shortcuts were taken in its design; most notably, its 32 MHz Motorola 68030 processor was crippled by a 16 MHz bus, making it slightly slower than the popular but aging Macintosh IIci. Its serial port was limited to 57.6 kbit/s, which could cause problems with serial connections and MIDI hardware. The Macintosh IIvi (a slower version of the IIvx with a 16 MHz processor) was introduced at the same time in some markets (though not the United States) but discontinued four months later. Representing the high end of the original Performa lineup, the Performa 600 was also based on the same architecture. The IIvx was one of the only Macintosh II models with a 32K L2 cache, following the IIfx's onboard 32K cache and the IIci's optional 32K cache card; neither the IIvi nor the Performa 600 supported an L2 cache, despite their similarities to the IIvx.

Hardware

The Macintosh IIvx uses the same case as the Performa 600, Centris 650, Quadra 650 (the speed-bumped refresh of the Centris 650), and Power Macintosh 7100. The IIvx can be upgraded to Centris/Quadra 650 by swapping the logic board.

While the IIvx shares the model designation of other Macintosh II computers, Apple originally intended the IIvx to be the first computer in the Macintosh Centris line. According to Apple, their lawyers were unable to complete the trademark check on the "Centris" name in time for the release of this computer so it ended up being sold the IIvx. Machines bearing the Centris name were introduced a few months later. Notably the Macintosh Centris 650 was released four months after the IIvx for $250 less, immediately rendering the IIvx obsolete, since the 650 was powered by the 68040 CPU. The IIvx's base price was slashed by more than a third. Because of increasing competition from Dell and other PC manufacturers, prices of the IIvx continued to fall quickly; by the end of June 1993, the price of the 5/80 + CD-ROM configuration had dropped to $1,799, about half its original price. For a while afterwards, people who bought an expensive Mac that quickly became outdated were said to have been "IIvx-ed".

Timelines

References

vx
IIvx
IIvx
IIvx
IIvx
Computer-related introductions in 1992